Limia, Spanish Limiana or in Galician raza Limiá, is a primitive cattle breed from the Province of Ourense in Galicia in northwest Spain, which in some features resembles the extinct aurochs.

Description

The average weight is 900 kg for males and 650 kg for females and the average height at the withers is 148 cm for males and 140 cm for females. The colour of the cows is brown, darker on head, neck and legs like other wild type coloured cows. Bulls have a darker coat colour than the cows, ranging from very dark brown to black, with a light eel stripe and sometimes a light saddle. Both sexes share a lightly coloured mouth.

The primitive anatomy and ecology of this breed makes it valuable for conservation, it is used by TaurOs Project in the Netherlands to create a breed that resembles the aurochs to the largest possible extent by crossbreeding primitive and aurochs-like breeds. Small herds of Limia graze under natural circumstances in the Netherlands already.

Population 

In 2002 the total population was 136 animals based on a studbook with high reliability. The
number of males used in reproduction was 59 and the number of breeding females was 66. The Percentage of females bred pure (mated with a male of the same race) was 100%. There were 460 animals ind 2007 and 861 animals in 2011. The population is thus quickly increasing.

See also 
 Aurochs
 Pajuna Cattle
 Sayaguesa Cattle

External links
 Raza Limiá

References 

Cattle breeds
Cattle breeds originating in Spain